The 1928 Ball Teachers Hoosieroons football team was an American football team that represented Ball Teachers College (later renamed Ball State University) during the 1928 college football season. The team played its home games at Normal Field in Muncie, Indiana.

Schedule

References

Muncie Normal
Ball State Cardinals football seasons
Muncie Normal Hoosieroons football